Siah Push or Siyah Push or Seyah Push or Siyapush or Siahpush may refer to:

Siah Push, Ardabil
Siah Push, Lorestan
Siah Push, Qazvin

See also
Siah-Posh Kafirs